Oeneis elwesi is a butterfly of the family Nymphalidae. It is found south of the Altai and Sayan Mountains and Mongolia.

Adults are on wing from May to June.

Subspecies
Oeneis elwesi elwesi (Altai, western Tuva)
Oeneis elwesi tannuola (south-eastern Tuva (Tannuola Mountains), north-western Mongolia, northern Mongolia)
Oeneis elwesi ulugchemi (central Tuva (Yenisei River basin))

External links
Russian Insects

Oeneis